Leif Hjørnevik (1910–1973) was a Norwegian civil servant and politician. He served as the County Governor of Telemark county from December 1969 until his death in 1973.

Leif Hjørnevik received his Cand.jur. degree in 1936. He then became a solicitor before starting his own legal practice. From 1939 to 1941 he was a deputy judge. He was employed in the Ministry of Finance, the Ministry of the Interior, and the Ministry of Justice during the Second World War. In 1945, he got a job as a manager in the Nordland county government. The following year, he moved to Larvik where be became the leader of the county government there, a position he held until 1959. This was followed by ten years as the finance manager in Trondheim. On 12 December 1969, he was appointed as the county governor of Telemark. In late 1972, he had become ill and went on leave from his job in the fall of 1972. He died on 13 June 1973.

References

1910 births
1973 deaths
County governors of Norway